In drama, a protasis is the introductory part of a play, usually its first act. The term was coined by the fourth-century Roman grammarian Aelius Donatus. He defined a play as being made up of three separate parts, the other two being epitasis and catastrophe. In modern dramatic theory the term dramatic arc has substantially the same meaning, though with slightly different divisions.

References

Drama
Ancient Greek theatre